Prata di Principato Ultra is a town and comune of the province of Avellino in the Campania region of southern Italy. The town spread along a hill on the left shore of the Sabato river.
The place is mentioned for the first time in a historical document in 1070.

References

External links
Official website

Cities and towns in Campania